Blackburn railway station serves the town of Blackburn in Lancashire, England.

History

There has been a station on the current site since 1846, when the Blackburn and Preston Railway (a constituent company of the East Lancashire Railway) was opened - the contract to build the station having been awarded in November 1845.

A fatal collision there that led to the deaths of 7 people in 1881 prompted the L&Y to make plans for another expansion & remodelling project, which was completed between 1886 & 1888. The new station had two island platforms, each with west-facing bays to give seven working faces in total plus an impressive two-bay overall roof. Long distance through coaches to Scotland and London Euston (via Manchester Victoria,  and ) also operated from here well into British Rail days.

The 1923 Grouping saw the station pass into the hands of the London, Midland and Scottish Railway, but it was not until after nationalisation in 1948 that traffic and services began to decline. The Great Harwood line was the first to lose its passenger services in 1957, whilst the through coaches to London were 'temporarily' suspended in 1959 for electrification work to take place on the Crewe to Manchester route but never reinstated. The biggest losses came though in the 1960s - Wigan trains were withdrawn in January 1960, those to Hellifield in September 1962 and the Southport line & Blackpool Central station both fell victim to the Beeching Axe in 1964. Thus when the lines & station were resignalled in 1973 (control passing to the new power box at Preston as part of the WCML modernisation scheme), three of the station's seven platforms were closed and a fourth (the current platform 4) reduced in length and downgraded to emergency use only. The remaining trains could quite easily be accommodated on platforms 1-3 (the northernmost island of the two). This method of operation would remain until the station underwent its most recent major rebuild in 2000 (see below). The 1980s & 90s would though see a revival in service provision, with the reopening to regular passenger traffic of the Copy Pit line in 1984 (initially on a twice-daily trial basis with services funded by a local building society) and the Ribble Valley line to Clitheroe a decade later in 1994.

Description 

The station is currently served by two lines.  One line runs north–south. comprising the re-opened Ribble Valley Line from Clitheroe in the north and continuing through Blackburn towards Darwen, Bolton and terminating at Manchester Victoria.

The station was covered by twin train sheds, an architecturally detailed canopy that covered all platforms. In 2000, due to its decaying state it was removed, changing the nature of the station in a £35 million regeneration project. A new building was built on the main island platform. The Grade II listed original entrance built in the 1880s, including the station buffet and former booking hall, was retained and refurbished. A piece of public artwork by artist Stephen Charnock was also erected at the edge of the platform, which consists of a stainless steel screen depicting Blackburn's industrial past and its more modern life today.  The images include some of Blackburn's most successful figures and famous visitors such as David Lloyd George (Liberal politician), Mahatma Gandhi (campaigner for Indian independence), Kathleen Ferrier (singer), Barbara Castle (Labour politician), Carl Fogarty (superbike racer), Wayne Hemingway (fashion designer) and Jack Walker (businessman).  Platform 4, which had previously not been in timetabled use since the 1970s, was reopened for regular services as part of the work.

In 2003 a police station was opened in the upper floor of the old booking hall, to provide services in the town centre when the town's main police station was replaced by Greenbank police station in Whitebirk.

The station is well connected with public transport in Blackburn, with the Blackburn Boulevard bus station (recently closed and moved to the old market site) was situated directly in front of the station building. In 2016 a new interchange opened outside the station with frequent buses heading to the new bus station.

In April 2011, £1.7 million was raised for the construction of a canopy on platform 4 and a lift to the subway below. From the refurbishment of the station 10 years earlier, only bus style shelters had been provided with no lift access.

On 24 October 2011, the rebuild of platform 4 was completed, now boasting a roof matching the one on platforms 1 and 2, lift, heated waiting room and improved flooring.

New LED departure information display screens have also been installed.

Services

On the Ribble Valley Line, there is now a half-hourly service southbound to Manchester Victoria and hourly northbound to Clitheroe (with peak extras). This service was extended, from mid-September, 2013, to cover Sundays throughout the remainder of the year - a pattern that continues as of March 2019 (though terminating at Hellifield, where connections are available for Carlisle). Additional services to/from Manchester Victoria and Clitheroe start or terminate here. From the December 2017 timetable change, the off-peak Monday to Saturday frequency over this route south of Blackburn has been improved to 2 trains per hour.

On the Caldervale Line, Monday to Saturdays there is an hourly Express service to  westbound and to Bradford Interchange,  and  eastbound.  This also runs on Sundays, albeit with a later start time. From November 2017 until May 2019, weekday trains terminated at Preston rather than running through to Blackpool North because of engineering work associated with route electrification on the Fylde line. 
 
From 17 May 2015, direct services to Manchester Victoria through Accrington and Burnley were introduced with the reopening of the Todmorden Curve - these run on an hourly frequency (including Sundays) and serve most local stations south of Todmorden.  In the May 2019 timetable, these trains continue beyond Manchester to  via Wigan Wallgate.

Platforms in use
The station has 4 platforms, the main platform (Platforms 1,2 & 3) includes a ticket office, waiting room, toilets and outdoor seating. The separate Platform 4 has a heated waiting room and outdoor seating. All three through platforms are bi-directional meaning any service can use any platform, however, most trains are booked on the following platforms:

The ticket office is staffed throughout the week (06:40-18:00 Mondays to Thursdays, 06:40-19:00 Fridays and Saturdays, 09:10-16:40 Sundays).  A self-service ticket machine is available for use when the booking office is closed and for collecting pre-paid/advance purchase tickets.

There is also a Station Kiosk on the concourse at the front of the station where rail users can purchase refreshments.

See also
 Listed buildings in Blackburn

References

External links 

 Blackburn Railway Station Glazed Platform Canopy

Grade II listed buildings in Lancashire
Grade II listed railway stations
Railway stations in Blackburn with Darwen
DfT Category C1 stations
Buildings and structures in Blackburn
Northern franchise railway stations
Former Lancashire and Yorkshire Railway stations
Railway stations in Great Britain opened in 1846
1846 establishments in England